
Gmina Opatów is an urban-rural gmina (administrative district) in Opatów County, Świętokrzyskie Voivodeship, in south-central Poland.

Villages
Apart from the town of Opatów, Gmina Opatów contains the villages and settlements of Adamów, Balbinów, Brzezie, Czerników Karski, Czerników Opatowski, Gojców, Jagnin, Jałowęsy, Jurkowice, Karwów, Kobylanki, Kobylany, Kochów, Kornacice, Lipowa, Marcinkowice, Nikisiałka Duża, Nikisiałka Mała, Oficjałów, Okalina, Okalina-Kolonia, Podole, Ptkanów, Rosochy, Strzyżowice, Tomaszów, Tudorów, Wąworków and Zochcinek.

Neighbouring gminas
Gmina Opatów is bordered by the gminas of Baćkowice, Ćmielów, Iwaniska, Lipnik, Sadowie and Wojciechowice.

References
Polish official population figures 2006

Opatow
Opatów County